The 2020-21 season was Ulster's 27th season since the advent of professionalism in rugby union, and Dan McFarland's third season as head coach. Iain Henderson was captain. They competed in the Pro14, the Pro14 Rainbow Cup, the European Rugby Champions Cup and the European Rugby Challenge Cup.

The Pro14 season was shortened by the COVID-19 pandemic, with the two South African teams unable to compete and the playoffs reduced to a final between the winners of the two conferences. Ulster finished second in Conference A, qualifying for next season's Champion's Cup. Scrum-half John Cooney was the league's leading scorer with 115 points. Number eight Marcell Coetzee was joint top try scorer with nine, and was named Players' Player of the Season. Ulster led the league in lineouts and scrums. Cooney and Coetzee made the Pro14 Dream Team, as did fullback Michael Lowry and loosehead prop Eric O'Sullivan.

The pool stage of the Champions Cup was reduced to two matches by the pandemic. Ulster lost both and failed to progress to the knockout stage, but were entered into the Challenge Cup, making the semi-finals where they lost to Leicester Tigers. The Pro14 regular season was followed by the Pro14 Rainbow Cup, played between the winners of a European pool and the winners of a pool containing the four ex-Super Rugby South African teams. Ulster finished tenth of twelve in the European pool, and led the competition in scrums.

John Cooney was Ulster's leading scorer with 174 points. Marcell Coetzee was leading try scorer with nine. Lock Alan O'Connor was leading tackler with 242, and was named Ulster's Player of the Year. This was Coetzee's last season with Ulster: he left in April to join the Bulls. Attack coach Dwayne Peel left at the end of the season to become head coach of Scarlets.

Staff

Squad

Senior squad

Players in
 Alby Mathewson unattached
 Ian Madigan from  Bristol Bears
 Bradley Roberts from Rainey Old Boys, initially as short-term injury cover, later permanent.
 Stewart Moore promoted from Academy

Players out
 Zack McCall released Clive Ross released Tommy O'Hagan released Angus Kernohan to  Ealing Trailfinders

Academy squad

Players in
  Reuben Crothers from Wallace High School
  Ben Carson from Wallace High School
  Nathan Doak from Wallace High School
  Lewis Finlay from Down High School
  Cormac Izuchukwu, from Ireland Sevens.

Players out
  Matthew Dalton to Utah Warriors
  Jack Regan released''
  Matthew Agnew 
  Joe Dunleavy
  Aaron Hall
  Graham Curtis

Events

Pre-season
Due to the mid-season break during the 2019–20 season caused by the COVID-19 pandemic, the 2020–21 season started later than usual.

New arrivals were scrum-half Alby Mathewson, formerly of Munster, and out-half Ian Madigan from Bristol Bears, although due to the delays caused by Covid-19, both had actually made their debuts and the end of the previous season. Hooker Bradley Roberts was signed from Rainey Old Boys as short-term injury cover, and ended up being kept on permanently. Wing Angus Kernohan departed for Ealing Trailfinders, hooker Zack McCall, prop Tommy O'Hagan and flanker Clive Ross were released.

Season
It was announced in December 2020 that the 2020–21 Pro14 season would conclude after 16 rounds, with the winners of each conference advancing straight to the final on 27 March 2021. Four South African Super Rugby teams - the Bulls, Lions, Sharks and Stormers - would then be introduced in the Rainbow Cup. Ulster finished second in Conference A, missing out on the final. They led the league in offloads with 130, tackle success at 90%, lineout success at 92%, scrums won at 97% and kicks retained with 11, and were second in points scored, tries, metres gained, defenders beaten, clean breaks and turnovers won. Scrum-half John Cooney was the league's leading points scorer with 115, and led the league in try assists with 13 and clean breaks with 22. Cooney, Fullback Michael Lowry, number 8 Marcell Coetzee and loosehead prop Eric O'Sullivan were named in the Pro14 Dream Team. Coetzee was named Players' Player of the Year, and was joint top try scorer, alongside Leinster's Scott Penny and Connacht's Alex Wootton.

The EPCR agreed a new format for the 2020–21 European Rugby Champions Cup in response to COVID-19: the top eight eligible teams from the Pro14, the Gallagher Premiership and Top 14 competed in a 24-team tournament divided into two pools of twelve teams, with each team playing four games in the pool stage - two at home and two away. After the first two rounds, the EPCR took the decision to temporarily suspend rounds 3 and 4, and later confirmed that rounds 3 and 4 would not take place. Having lost their opening two pool matches, Ulster were eliminated from the Champions Cup and joined the Challenge Cup in the round of 16. After strong performances in away wins against Harlequins and Northampton Saints, Ulster faced a semi-final away to Leicester Tigers. They controlled the game in the first half, but after John Cooney departed with a head injury, Ulster's performance fell away, and a masterclass by England fly-half George Ford won the tie for Leicester.

Leading try-scorer Marcell Coetzee left in April. He had announced his intention to go home to South Africa and join the Bulls, but after he sustained a season-ending injury in March, the club agreed to release him from his contract early.

Ulster's poor performance in the second half of the Challenge Cup semi-final followed them into the Rainbow Cup, and they finished tenth of twelve in the European pool.

Academy players Cormac Izuchukwu, Nathan Doak, David McCann, Callum Reid and Aaron Sexton all made their senior debuts this season. Billy Burns and Eric O'Sullivan made their international debuts with Ireland.

European Rugby Champions Cup

Pool B

European Rugby Challenge Cup

Round of 16

Quarter-final

Semi-final

Pro14

Pro14 Rainbow Cup

Ulster 'A'

Home attendance

Awards
The Heineken Ulster Rugby Awards ceremony was held online on 7 June 2021. Winners were:

Heineken Ulster Rugby Personality of the Year: Iain Henderson
Bank of Ireland Player of the Year: Alan O'Connor (nominees: John Cooney, Marty Moore)
Ulster Rugby Supporters' Club Player of the Year: John Cooney (nominees: Marcell Coetzee, Michael Lowry)
Rugby Writers' Player of the Year: Nick Timoney (nominees: Michael Lowry, Jordi Murphy)
Openreach Young Player of the Year: James Hume (nominees: Michael Lowry, Ethan McIlroy)

Season reviews
Ulster 2020-21 - Who Did What?, The Front Row Union, 12 August 2021
Don’t Cry In Front Of The Mexicans: Ulster’s 2020-21 Season (And How They Must Keep Twirling, Twirling, Twirling Towards Freedom in 2021-22), Digging Like a Demented Mole, 28 June 2021
"The Ulster depth chart: A World Cup winner and the thrilling back three", The42, 17 September 2021

References

2020-21
2020–21 in Irish rugby union
2020–21 Pro14 by team
2020–21 European Rugby Champions Cup by team